Karyshevo (Käreş) is a rural locality (a village) in Zildyarovsky Selsoviet, Miyakinsky District, Bashkortostan, Russia. The population was 11 as of 2010. There is 1 street.

Geography 
Karyshevo is located 43 km southwest of Kirgiz-Miyaki (the district's administrative centre) by road. Islamgulovo is the nearest rural locality.

References 

Rural localities in Miyakinsky District